Prasophyllum basalticum is a species of orchid endemic to New South Wales. It has a single tubular, dark green leaf and up to fifteen scented, greenish-brown to brownish-red flowers with a white and green labellum. It grows in grassy woodland on the Northern Tablelands.

Description
The flowers are greenish-brown to brownish-red and sweetly scented. As with others in the genus, the flowers are inverted so that the labellum is above the column rather than below it. There is an egg-shaped green callus in the centre of the labellum, extending to slightly past the bend. Flowering occurs in November and December.

Taxonomy and naming
Prasophyllum basalticum was first formally described in 2018 by David Jones and Lachlan Copeland from a specimen collected in Werrikimbe National Park and the description was published in Australian Orchid Review. The specific epithet (basalticum) is derived from the Latin word basaltes meaning "basalt", referring to the soils of basaltic origin in which this species usually grows.

Distribution and habitat

References

External links 

basalticum
Orchids of New South Wales
Endemic orchids of Australia
Plants described in 2018